Kopargaon Assembly constituency is one of the 288 Vidhan Sabha (Legislative Assembly) constituencies of Maharashtra state in Western India.

Overview
Kopargaon (constituency number 219) is one of the twelve Vidhan Sabha constituencies located in the Ahmednagar district. It comprises  the entire Kopargaon taluka of the district.

Kopargaon is part of the Shirdi Lok Sabha constituency along with five other Vidhan Sabha segments in this district, namely Akole, Shirdi, Sangamner, Shrirampur and Nevasa.

Members of Legislative Assembly

See also
 Sangamner
 List of constituencies of Maharashtra Vidhan Sabha

References

Assembly constituencies of Maharashtra
Year of establishment missing